John Slocum may refer to:

 Colonel John S. Slocum (1824–1861), namesake of Fort Slocum (Washington, D.C.)
 John Slocum (1838–1897), the founder of the Indian Shaker Church
 John W. Slocum (1867–1938), American lawyer and politician
 John J. Slocum (1914–1997), diplomat and bibliographer
 John L. Slocum (1920–1998), inventor of the Slocum stone